PTC Therapeutics is a US pharmaceutical company focused on the development of orally administered small molecule drugs and gene therapy which regulate gene expression by targeting post-transcriptional control (PTC) mechanisms in orphan diseases.

In September 2009, PTC entered into an agreement with Roche for the development of orally bioavailable small molecules for central nervous system diseases. In 2020, PTC announced the FDA approval of Evrysdi™ (risdiplam) for the treatment of spinal muscular atrophy (SMA) in adults and children 2 months and older, in partnership with the SMA Foundation and Roche.

PTC acquired the Bio-e platform in 2019. The Bio-e platform utilizes expertise in electron-transfer chemistry to modulate key biological processes beyond the reach of current drug development approaches. The lead compounds from the Bio-e platform, PTC743 and PTC857, target the enzyme 15-lipoxygenase – a key enzymatic hub that regulates the inflammation and oxidative stress that underpin mitochondrial disease and CNS pathology. Two pivotal studies will investigate the safety and efficacy of PTC743: a Phase 2/3 trial in refractory mitochondrial epilepsy and a Phase 3 trial in Friedreich’s ataxia.

Products 
In 2017, PTC acquired Emflaza (deflazacort) from Marathon Pharmaceuticals. PTC also owns Translarna, (Ataluren) marketed for nonsense mutation Duchenne muscular dystrophy.  Together, the two products generated revenues of 174 million dollars and 260 million dollars in 2017 and 2018 respectively.

PTC has the commercialization rights for WAYLIVRA™ (volanesorsen) in Latin America. WAYLIVRA™ is approved in the European Union for the treatment of familial chylomicronemia syndrome (FCS). TEGSEDI® (inotersen) was granted marketing approval from the Brazilian Health Regulatory Agency (ANVISA) for the treatment of stage 1 or 2 polyneuropathy in adult patients with hereditary transthyretin amyloidosis (hATTR). PTC has licensed the commercialization rights for TEGSEDI® (inotersen) in Latin America from Akcea Therapeutics.

Pipeline 
In 2018, PTC acquired Agilis Biotherapeutics and a gene therapy candidate, GT-AADC, with its compelling clinical data in treating aromatic L-amino acid decarboxylase (AADC) deficiency. AADC deficiency is a rare CNS disorder arising from reductions in the enzyme AADC that result from mutations in the dopa decarboxylase (DDC) gene.

In 2020, PTC acquired Censa Pharmaceuticals, Inc., a biopharmaceutical company focused on the development of CNSA-001 (sepiapterin), a clinical-stage investigational therapy for orphan metabolic diseases, including phenylketonuria (PKU) and other diseases associated with defects in the tetrahydrobiopterin (BH4) biochemical pathways diagnosed at birth.

References

Further reading

External links
 

Biotechnology
Pharmaceutical companies based in New Jersey
Companies based in Middlesex County, New Jersey
South Plainfield, New Jersey
Companies listed on the Nasdaq